Nathan Massey may refer to:

Nathan Massey (rugby league, born 1989), United States international rugby player who played for the Castleford Tigers
Nathan Massey (Australian rugby league) (born 1991), Canberra Raiders rugby player
Nathan Massey (Love Island), winner of a reality TV show